Jing Xiang or Xiang Jing may refer to:

 Jing Xiang (politician) (died 923), Chinese politician
 Xiang Jing (artist) (born 1968), Chinese artist
 Jing Xiang (boxer) (born 1989), Chinese boxer
 Jing Xiang (actress) (born 1993), Chinese German actress